Skotterud is the administrative centre of Eidskog Municipality in Innlandet county, Norway. The village is located along the Norwegian National Road 2 and the Kongsvingerbanen railway line.

The local industry is heavily associated with forestry, including some sawmills and other timber-related businesses.

References

Eidskog
Villages in Innlandet